Henry Westman Richardson (July 21, 1855 – October 27, 1918) was a Canadian businessman and Senator.

He was the head of James Richardson and Sons, a commodities firm based in Kingston, Ontario that was founded by his father which handled virtually all of Canada's grain exports to the United Kingdom during World War I. Richardson became president of the firm following the death of his brother, in 1906. He was president until his own death in 1918.

Richardson also sat on the boards of directors of several railway companies as well as Dominion Canneries. He was a member of the Boards of Trade in Toronto, Montreal and Winnipeg. He was an Alderman in Kingston and President of the Board of Education.

He was appointed to the Senate of Canada on 22 January 1917 and sat as a Conservative until his death a year later.

Early life 
Henry Westman (a misspelling of Wartman) Richardson was born the son of James Richardson and Susannah Wartman on 21 July 1855 in Kingston. He attended Kingston Collegiate Institute. On 14 April 1885, he married Alice Ford, daughter of R.G. Ford of Kingston. Together they had three daughters and three sons.

Professional life 
Richardson was involved in a number of business, and educational organizations, as follows:
J. Richardson and Sons Limited - President 1906-1918
 Kingston, Portsmouth & Cataraqui Electric Railway - President 
 Kingston Feldspar and Mining Company - President and General Manager 
 Dominion Canners. Limited - Director 
 North American Smelting Company - president and general manager 
 Travelers Life Assurance Company of Canada - Officer and Shareholders' Director 
 Kingston Hosiery Limited - President 
 Kingston Street Railway Company - President
 Mississquoi Marble Company - President
 Phillipsburg Railway Company - President
 Kingston Board of Trade - President
 Liquor License Commissioner - 1911 
 City Council Kingston, 1892 
 Cataraqui Golf and Country Club - President 
 School of Mining, Kingston - Governor
 Kingston Yacht Association - President 
 Board of Education, Kingston

Senate 
Appointed on the advice of Robert Laird Borden, Richardson was summoned to the Senate of Canada on 22 January 1917. He was a Conservative  and a member of the Standing Committee on Railways, Telegraphs and Harbours and a member of Standing Joint Committee on the Library of Parliament.

Post war Empire
In anticipation of the end of World War I, Ontario Premier, Sir William Hearst, asked,  "In the day when Canada has a population equal to the British Isles, does any suggest that she should leave the question of peace and war to a Parliament over which she has no control?". As a result a number of Senators, including Richardson, signed an agreement to define the role of Canada in a post-war Imperial Age. The agreement including these ideas: 
Canada strengthened its ties to Great Britain by participating in WWI
Effective Empire government must not sacrifice domestic policy nor surrender fiscal responsibility.
The Dominions need to share defense of the Empire and should have a voice in policy with other states.
Political leaders throughout the Empire should meet to discuss the ideas.

As the war had not concluded, Ontario Liberal Leader, N.W. Rowell, advised that the priority should be save the Empire first and plan to reorganize it after the war.

Death
Richardson died suddenly from angina pectoris on 27 October 1918.

In December 1918, the Kingston Hosiery Company entered into voluntary liquidation as Richardson was the principal stockholder and his son did not wish to continue the business of the company.

His nephew, James Armstrong Richardson, Sr., became president of James Richardson and Sons in 1919.

References

External links

1855 births
1918 deaths
Canadian senators from Ontario
Conservative Party of Canada (1867–1942) senators
Businesspeople from Ontario
People from Kingston, Ontario
Persons of National Historic Significance (Canada)
Richardson family